The Anjar Formation is a geologic formation in India where dinosaur eggs have been found.

References

Geologic formations of India
Maastrichtian Stage